Isaac Karamoko (born 26 May 2002) is a French professional footballer who plays as a forward for Serie A club Sassuolo.

Career
A former youth academy player of Paris Saint-Germain, Karamoko left the club in June 2020 upon the expiration of his contract. After spending few months as a free agent, he signed his first professional contract with Sassuolo in November 2020. On 7 April 2021, he made his professional debut in a 2–1 league defeat against Inter Milan.

On 1 February 2022, Karamoko was loaned to Apollon Larissa in Greece.

Personal life
Born in France, Karamoko is of Ivorian descent.

Career statistics

References

External links
 

2002 births
Living people
French sportspeople of Ivorian descent
Association football forwards
French footballers
Serie A players
Super League Greece 2 players
U.S. Sassuolo Calcio players
Apollon Larissa F.C. players
French expatriate footballers
French expatriate sportspeople in Italy
French expatriate sportspeople in Greece
Expatriate footballers in Italy
Expatriate footballers in Greece